Enzo Couacaud was the defending champion but chose not to defend his title.

Jo-Wilfried Tsonga won the title after defeating Dudi Sela 6–1, 6–0 in the final.

Seeds
All seeds receive a bye into the second round.

Draw

Finals

Top half

Section 1

Section 2

Bottom half

Section 3

Section 4

References

External links
Main draw

2019 ATP Challenger Tour